Gary Krist may refer to:

Gary Steven Krist (born 1945), American kidnapper and drug smuggler
Gary Krist (writer) (born 1957), American writer and journalist